Sterculia khasiana was a species of plant in the family Malvaceae. It was an endemic tree of the Khasi Hills in Meghalaya in India. It became extinct due to habitat loss.

References

khasiana
Extinct flora of Asia
Extinct biota of Asia
Flora of Meghalaya
Taxonomy articles created by Polbot